Klosterlechfeld station is a railway station in the municipality of Klosterlechfeld, in Bavaria, Germany. It is located on the Bobingen–Landsberg am Lech line of Deutsche Bahn.

Services
 the following services stop at Klosterlechfeld:

References

External links
 
 Klosterlechfeld layout 
 

Railway stations in Bavaria
Buildings and structures in Augsburg (district)